Salicornia maritima, the sea glasswort, is a succulent, salt-tolerant plant found in New Brunswick and in Newfoundland and Labrador.

It produces flowers towards late summer or beginning of fall.

This plant is sometimes mistaken for salicornia depressa.

References 

maritima
Flora of Newfoundland
Flora of Labrador